Yan Yude is a Chinese billionaire whose fortune derives from his stake in Virscend, a Chinese private education firm. He graduated from Sichuan University and resides in Chengdu.

References

Chinese billionaires
Year of birth missing (living people)
Living people
Place of birth missing (living people)
Sichuan University alumni